Susanne Maria von Sandrart (10 August 1658 in Nuremberg – 20 December 1716 in Nuremberg) was a German artist and engraver. She was the daughter of engraver Jacob von Sandrart, and most of her work was produced for his workshop. At a young age, Von Sandrart began to learn different means of graphic art, producing artwork from her father's home studio.

Further reading 
 Sabina Lessmann: Susanna Maria von Sandrart (1658-1716). Arbeitsbedingungen einer nürnberger Grafikerin im 17. Jahrhundert. Georg Olms Verlag, 1991. .
 Britta-Juliane Kruse: Witwen. Kulturgeschichte eines Standes in Spätmittelalter und früher Neuzeit. De Gruyter Verlag, 2006. 
 Nadja Bennewitz, Gaby Franger (ed.): „Am Anfang war Sigena. Ein Nürnberger Frauengeschichtsbuch.”, pp. 124–132. ars vivendi verlag, Cadolzburg, 2000. .

References

External links 
 
 Entry for Susanne Maria von Sandrart on the Union List of Artist Names

1658 births
1716 deaths
Artists from Nuremberg
German engravers
German women artists
Women engravers
German people of Belgian descent